Waitabit Peak is located on the border of Alberta and British Columbia. It was named in 1900 after Waitabit Creek.

See also
 List of peaks on the British Columbia–Alberta border

References

Three-thousanders of Alberta
Three-thousanders of British Columbia
Canadian Rockies
Mountains of Banff National Park